Paul Nesbitt (April 3, 1872July 22, 1950) was an American politician, who served as Speaker of the Oklahoma House of Representatives. He also served as a secretary for Governor Charles N. Haskell and as a Cabinet member for Governor John C. Walton. Educated at Chicago Medical College, he was a doctor and newspaperman before his entry into Oklahoma politics.

Nesbitt died July 22, 1950, in Talihina, Oklahoma.

Early life
Nesbitt was born April 3, 1872, at Milford, Iowa, the son of James and Evaline Nesbitt. His father was a first lieutenant in the United States Army and his grandfather was an Irish immigrant who served under George Washington in the American Revolutionary War.

Growing up in Nebraska, he was educated at Chicago Medical College and practiced medicine in Vinton, Iowa, El Dorado Springs, Missouri, and finally in Watonga, a town in Oklahoma Territory, in 1899. Nesbitt briefly owned the Watonga Herald. He abandoned his practice in 1904 and went to St. Louis, Missouri, to apprentice as a cub reporter and later worked for the Joplin Globe.

In 1906, he returned to Oklahoma to direct the publicity campaign for the Democratic candidates wanting to serve as delegates to the Oklahoma constitutional convention. He did not support the nomination of Charles N. Haskell in the Democratic primary, but ended up serving as secretary for Oklahoma's first governor. and helped carry the state seal from Guthrie, Oklahoma, to Oklahoma City in 1910.

Political career
Nesbitt represented Pittsburg County in the Oklahoma Legislature during the sessions of the 5th, 6th, and 7th Oklahoma Legislature legislatures.

He supported John C. Walton for governor and served as a Cabinet member under Walton.

Death
Nesbitt died July 22, 1950, in Talihina, Oklahoma, of a cerebral hemorrhage.

References

1872 births
1950 deaths
People from Dickinson County, Iowa
People from Vinton, Iowa
Speakers of the Oklahoma House of Representatives
Democratic Party members of the Oklahoma House of Representatives
20th-century American politicians